Mount Eden is a suburb in Auckland, New Zealand

Mount Eden may also refer to:

Places
Maungawhau / Mount Eden, a volcano in Auckland, New Zealand
Mount Eden, California, in Hayward, California
Mount Eden Landing, former name of Eden Landing, California
Mount Eden, Bronx, a neighborhood in the Bronx section of New York City

Transport
Mt Eden Train Station, Auckland, New Zealand
Mount Eden Avenue (IRT Jerome Avenue Line), New York City subway

Other
Mt. Eden High School, in Hayward, California
Mount Eden Prisons, in Auckland, New Zealand
 Mt Eden, duo specializing in producing dubstep music from New Zealand